Duel is an American game show hosted by Mike Greenberg that first aired from December 17 to December 23, 2007 on ABC. The show aired as a week-long six-episode tournament at 8:00 p.m. (7:00 p.m. Central) from Monday through Friday with the finale on Sunday.

The show's website described the program as a cross between Who Wants to Be a Millionaire? and the World Series of Poker. The game was played in a head-to-head format in which contestants answered general trivia questions, with wrong answers contributing to a growing jackpot. The winner of the Duel jackpot of $1,720,000 was Ashlee Register, whose grand total was nearly $1.8 million when combined with previous winnings, making her the highest-winning female game show contestant in the U.S.

The second season aired in a weekly format with modified rules from April 4, 2008 to July 25, 2008 at 9:00 p.m. (8:00 p.m. Central).

Both seasons were sponsored by Diet Pepsi Max led by Russell Findlay, the Pepsi marketing executive who launched Pepsi Max in the USA.

Gameplay

Season 1
Each player began a duel with ten chips, each worth $5,000 (for a combined total of $50,000). Before each question was asked, a screen rose between the contestants to hide their answers from each other. The duel always began with the catchphrase "Let's Duel!" before the question was heard. Each question was multiple choice with four choices. The question was read by the host while the contestants used their chips to cover choices, one chip per choice. They were allowed to cover any number of choices, provided they had enough chips. After both players had locked in their answers, the screen was lowered so contestants could see each other's choices, and the correct answer was then revealed. All chips placed on wrong answers were taken away, and their value was added to a jackpot.

While the questions normally had no time limit, a contestant who had already locked in his/her answers could "press" the opponent and impose a seven-second time limit, after which answers would be automatically locked in. Each contestant was given two presses per duel.

The duel continued until at least one contestant failed to cover the correct answer to a question. If only one contestant failed to answer correctly, that contestant was eliminated; any chips the contestant had not played were not added to the jackpot, though any played on wrong answers were still added. The winning contestant became champion and won the value of any chips they still possessed, including the one covering the correct answer. That money was theirs to keep, regardless of the outcome of future duels.

If neither player covered the correct answer, however, the duel went to a sudden death "shootout". For the shootout, there were no presses and each player received four new chips with no cash value. If only one player answered correctly, that player won the duel and became champion, but won no money. If both players answered correctly, the player who covered fewer choices won. (It is unknown what would have happened in any other situation, as no such situation ever aired.)

The champion then chose a new challenger from a randomly selected group of three from the remaining members of the "Players Gallery" (those in the contestant pool who had not yet participated), based on a small amount of information revealed about each potential contestant. Contestants who had dueled were ranked by number of duels won, and then by cash winnings as a tiebreaker; After five nights, the four top contestants competed for the jackpot on the finale.

During the finale, the top-seeded player was given the choice of which other finalist he wanted to face in the first semifinal duel, leaving the two other finalists to play in the second. The winners of each semifinal advanced to the final duel to play for the entire jackpot. The final round duel played the same as the qualifying duels, with lost chips continuing to add to the jackpot, and any winnings kept. The winner of the final duel claimed the jackpot, as well as all earnings accumulated in previous duels.

Results
In the final duel on December 23, 2007, contestants Ashlee Register (a registered nurse) and Robert Elswick (a used car salesman) played for a jackpot totaling $1,720,000. Ashlee Register won the duel on the first question to claim a grand total of $1,795,000, including the $75,000 she had earned in previous duels.

The (first and only) question of the final duel for $1.72 million was:

While Register covered all four answers on her side (later stating that she "didn't want to take a gamble on the first question"), Elswick covered all except the correct answer; when Greenberg asked him about his logic, Elswick eventually realized that oil floats on water and hence is lighter than water, so A is correct.

Season 2
The way questions were played remained the same, but the producers changed the game format to accommodate continuing weekly episodes. First, each contestant received one press per game rather than two. Second, the chips had no monetary value; instead, the prize value of a duel was determined by its length. Thus, unlike the first season's tournament, the potential prize increased as a duel progressed:

If both contestants missed a question, the value of the duel was frozen at the previous value; the format of the "shootout" used to determine the winner was identical to the tournament format.

For the weekly series, a bonus round was added after each duel. The winner was asked a single "Max Question" and was given one chip and seven seconds to respond. A correct answer doubled the contestant's winnings from the just-played duel, for a potential maximum of $100,000. There was no penalty for a wrong answer.

Winning contestants then had the option to take their winnings and leave, or to risk them to play another duel against their choice of three contestants. If they lost in their second or third duel, they forfeited all their winnings, while a loss in their fourth or fifth duel cut their winnings in half. A contestant who won five duels in a row had his/her winnings increased to a total of $500,000, without having to play a Max Question after the fifth victory, and retired as an undefeated champion. When a contestant chose to leave or won the jackpot, the next two contestants to play were the ones not chosen by the champion for the previous duel.

Results
On Friday, May 2, 2008, a former film executive for Reason Pictures / GOOD Magazine, 24-year-old Gabriel Reilich from Los Angeles, California, won five duels to become the season's only $500,000 prize winner (he had won $75,000 in his four previous duels and correctly answered every Max Question). 

Gabriel won his fifth duel on the question:

Broadcast history
Duel was created by the Francophone production house FrenchTV, with BermanBraun being the U.S. production firm. It is headed by Lloyd Braun and Gail Berman, both former network executives.

The series first aired from December 17 to December 23, 2007 on ABC at 8:00 PM (7:00 Central) from Monday through Friday and its finale on Sunday; for its first four nights, it was up against Clash of the Choirs on NBC.

Initial reviews were mixed; some praised the show for bringing something different and original to American television, while others derided Greenberg's hosting on the first night and the amount of "padding" the first episode (which was 90 minutes in length) seemed to have. Several critics derided the show for giving contestants "stereotypical" titles, such as "The Fire Captain" and "The Alligator Wrestler".

As the series progressed, however, critics began noticing how several contestants were chosen at random several times in a row, yet were never picked by the on-stage contestant; three contestants didn't play in the tournament at all.

Nielsen ratings

Season 1
Duel'''s ratings were not as good as its opponent for its first four shows, NBC's Clash of the Choirs.

Season 2
Season Two aired on Friday nights at 9:00 p.m. (8:00 p.m. Central). The first two episodes had to compete with CBS' The Price Is Right $1,000,000 Spectacular, which aired at the same time. Also since the season premiere, the show was standing and lagging at sixth place behind The CW's second hour of WWE Friday Night SmackDown and the Univision telenovela Pasíon.

International versions
Actually ITV in U.K. were the first network to purchase the rights to Duel in September 2007, swiftly followed by ABC in the U.S., who launched their first series of the show, hosted by sport broadcaster Mike Greenberg, on 17 December 2007. The American version ran 16 episodes in 2 seasons and was not renewed for a third season. France 2 was the third network to obtain the rights to the game show under the name Le 4e duel, aired on 2008 until 2013.

The Duel format was optioned by television networks in Australia, Belgium, Brazil, France, Germany, Hungary, Italy, Mexico, the Netherlands, Poland, Portugal and Spain, but, with the exception of Hungary, Portugal, and Duel's native France, never made it to production in those territories.

Hungarian version
The game is produced in Hungary titled Párbaj (Hungarian for Duel), starting on 31 August 2009 on TV2. It is hosted by István Vágó. It runs on weekdays from 19:05 to 20:15. After each duel, the winner it is given a bonus question with 3 tokens to use. Winnings are determined by the number of duels won and the number of tokens used in the bonus question (as long as the correct answer is chosen). The highest prize is possible after winning 5 duels and its value is 25 million forints. Players have 2 accelerators per duel. The phrase at the beginning of each duel is "En garde!".

A web version of the game is available on TV2's official website.

 French version
France 2 was the third network to obtain the rights to the game show under the name Le 4e duel'', aired on 2008 until 2013.

References

External links
 Official Website 
 

2000s American game shows
2007 American television series debuts
Quiz shows
2008 American television series endings
Television series by Rocket Science Laboratories